Undivided Heart & Soul is the third studio album by American singer-songwriter JD McPherson. It was released on October 6, 2017, through New West Records.

Accolades

Track listing

Charts

References

2017 albums
New West Records albums